Kamyshinsky (masculine), Kamyshinskaya (feminine), or Kamyshinskoye (neuter) is the name of several rural localities in Russia:
Kamyshinsky (rural locality), a khutor in Sirotinsky Selsoviet of Ilovlinsky District of Volgograd Oblast
Kamyshinskaya, a village in Partizansky Rural Okrug of Abatsky District of Tyumen Oblast